Anton Skipper Hendriksen (born 31 March 2000) is a Danish professional footballer who plays as a centre-back for Eliteserien club Sarpsborg 08. He has been capped for Denmark at youth level.

Early and personal life
The family of Skipper is originally from Lolland, but he was born and raised in Vestegnen, Greater Copenhagen. When he went to primary school, he skipped second grade which he meant contributed to him becoming mature from an early age.

Club career

Brøndby 
Skipper joined Brøndby IF aged 4. After playing in the youth of Hvidovre IF for a few years, he rejoined Brøndby in the spring of 2013 at under-13 level. In April 2015, Skipper signed his first contract with Brøndby, keeping him in the club until 2017. As an under-19 player, German club VfL Wolfsburg showed interest in signing him to their youth academy, but a move never materialised.

On 30 November 2019, Brøndby announced that Skipper would become a permanent part of the first team in the spring of 2019. Concomitantly, he signed his first professional contract which would keep him in the club until 2021.

On 28 July 2019, Skipper made his competitive debut with a start in the Danish Superliga match against OB which ended with a 3–2 win for Brøndby. His performance was subsequently praised by pundits. Since his debut in week three of the Danish Superliga, he played each match until Brøndby signed free agent Andreas Maxsø in mid-September. Despite assuming a new role as a substitute, Skipper was still recognised and lauded by the fans of the club. On 22 January 2020, Skipper signed a new three-and-a-half-year contract with Brøndby, running until 2023.

Loan to Hobro
On 29 January 2021, Skipper was loaned out to Danish 1st Division club Hobro on a six-month deal. He made his debut for the club on 13 February in a 1–1 draw against HB Køge.

Return to Brøndby
Upon his return to Brøndby for the 2021–22 season, Skipper began making more appearances due to the departure of regular starters Hjörtur Hermannsson and Anthony Jung. He made his European debut on 17 August 2021 in the UEFA Champions League play-off first leg against Red Bull Salzburg, which ended in a 1–2 loss.

Sarpsborg 08
On 24 January 2022, Skipper signed a three-year contract with Norwegian Eliteserien club Sarpsborg 08. He made his competitive debut for the club on 3 April, coming off the bench in the 36rd minute for injured Magnar Ødegaard and putting on a convincing performance despite a 1–0 loss at home to Viking in the 2022 season opener. The following week, he was a starter at centre-back alongside Bjørn Inge Utvik in a 3–2 away victory against Kristiansund.

International career 
Skipper has won two caps for Denmark at U19 level, and has played multiple matches for national youth teams at different levels.

Career statistics

References

External links 

Anton Skipper at brondby.com

2000 births
Living people
Danish men's footballers
Danish expatriate men's footballers
Denmark under-21 international footballers
Denmark youth international footballers
Association football defenders
Danish Superliga players
Danish 1st Division players
Brøndby IF players
Hobro IK players
Sarpsborg 08 FF players
People from Brøndby Municipality
Expatriate footballers in Norway
Danish expatriate sportspeople in Norway
Sportspeople from the Capital Region of Denmark